The Tenth Level is a 1976 American made-for-television drama film movie starring William Shatner.  Inspired by the Stanley Milgram obedience research, this TV movie chronicles a psychology professor's study to determine why people, such as the Nazis, were willing to "just follow orders" and do horrible things to others. Professor Stephen Turner (Shatner) leads students to believe that they are applying increasingly painful electric shocks to other subjects when they fail to perform a task correctly, and is alarmed to see how much pain the students can be convinced to inflict "in the name of science".

In the movie dramatization there were actually 25 levels of increasing voltage and pain. However, the so-called tenth level was significant in that it was always the first time in which the actual test subject heard the other (false) test subject cry out in pain.

It was the TV debuts of Stephen Macht and Lindsay Crouse, and John Travolta has an uncredited part as a student.

Plot
The movie fictionalized Milgram as academic psychologist Stephen Turner, a somewhat quiet man consumed with Nazi concentration camp imagery. He was portrayed by William Shatner. Because the fictional Turner was not Jewish (as Milgram was) but a “WASP", this obsession was pathological, a reflection of guilt and a need for martyrdom, according to Turner's friend Ben, a black psychologist played by Ossie Davis.

With horror-movie music in the background, the movie showed Turner's experiments going forward, particularly emphasizing the intense nervous reactions of subjects, but did not let viewers themselves know that the "learner" was not being shocked until the play was more than half over, thus emphasizing the film's portrait of the psychologist as crazy.

Turner was subjected to an ethical inquiry after one subject, Barry, a student who had served in the army during Vietnam, had a breakdown during the experiment and destroyed the equipment.  Many of the subjects that viewers had seen breaking down earlier during the trials testified to the value of the experiment, including Barry. “Had I been over there in My Lai, I would have shot dogs, cats, women, children, old men, babies. I would have wasted them all," he told the ethics board. "I’m grateful to Dr. Turner, ‘cause you see I know what is inside of me."

The last scene of the movie focused on a confrontation between Turner and his former lover, another psychologist on faculty, who demanded that he see the comparison between himself and his subjects: “You’ve been tested like your subjects. You had a choice, you could have stopped. Your ends, which were knowledge, for that you knowingly inflicted pain." The film ended with Turner sobbing on her shoulder.

Production
According to writer George Bellack, when he first presented the idea of The Tenth Level to a group of TV executives, many were outraged by the idea.  The president of ABC called it "godless" but it was ultimately shown in prime time on Playhouse 90. Although scheduled for showing in the Christmas season of 1975, the drama did not air until August 26, 1976, because it took that long to assemble a critical mass of sponsors. Major sponsors like IBM, Xerox. AT&T and General Motors refused to sponsor it.

Shatner gave up his divorce rights to see his children on Christmas Day to film the program.

Milgram was paid $5,000 as a consultant on the film.  He had very little input in the film.  He felt the movie was dull, with the "genuine drama underlying the obedience problem getting lost in the welter of video cliches".

The Tenth Level was shot directly on videotape at the CBS Broadcast Center in New York City and on location at Yale University where the original Milgram experiments had taken place, and presented as a teleplay reminiscent of the "Golden Age of Television".

The film has never been released on video or DVD.

Awards
 The movie received honorable mention at American Psychological Association's National Media Awards in 1977.

See also
 Dannie Abse's play, The Dogs of Pavlov
 Experimenter (film)

Notes

External links
 

1976 television films
1976 films
1976 drama films
American drama films
Drama films based on actual events
Films set in universities and colleges
Paramount Pictures films
CBS network films
1970s American films